Mohawk may refer to:

Related to Native Americans
Mohawk people, an indigenous people of North America (Canada and New York)
Mohawk language, the language spoken by the Mohawk people
Mohawk hairstyle, from a hairstyle once thought to have been traditionally worn by the Mohawk people
Mohawk people (Oregon), a band of the Kalapuya Native American tribe in the U.S. state of Oregon

Places

Communities
Mohawk, Arizona
Mohawk, California
Mohawk, Indiana
Mohawk, Herkimer County, New York
Mohawk, Montgomery County, New York
Mohawk, Oregon
Mohawk, Tennessee
Mohawk, Virginia

Lakes, rivers and waterfalls
Lake Mohawk (Ohio)
 Mohawk River (disambiguation)
Mohawk Falls, one of the waterfalls in Ricketts Glen State Park in Pennsylvania

Other
United States
Mohawk Dam, Jefferson Township, Ohio
Mohawk Mountains, in southwestern Arizona
Mohawk State Forest, in Connecticut
Mohawk Valley, the area surrounding the Mohawk River in New York
Mohawk Valley (Arizona)
Canada
Mohawk Island, Ontario, Canada

Ships
USS Mohawk, three US Navy ships, as well as Coast Guard and Revenue cutters and a navy reserve tug
HMS Mohawk, thirteen ships of the Royal Navy
Mohawk, a wooden steamboat once known as the Inland Flyer

Aircraft
Curtiss P-36 Hawk, an American fighter aircraft called the Mohawk in British service
Grumman OV-1 Mohawk military observation aircraft
Las Brisas Mohawk, an American homebuilt aircraft design
Miles Mohawk, 1930s British monoplane

In business
Mohawk Airlines, a defunct airline
Mohawk Productions, Inc., a television company
Mohawk Gasoline, a gasoline station company in Canada owned by Husky Energy
Mohawk Innovative Technology, a product and research and development technology company
Mohawk Mall, a defunct mall in Niskayuna, New York
Mohawk Commons (Niskayuna, New York), the retail center that replaced Mohawk Mall
Mohawk Industries, a flooring manufacturer based in Calhoun, Georgia, USA

In music
Essra Mohawk (born 1947), American singer-songwriter
Frazier Mohawk (born 1941), American record producer and husband of Essra Mohawk
The Mohawks, a band fronted by composer Alan Hawkshaw
Mohawk, a jazz tune composed by Charlie Parker appearing on the 1950 album Bird & Diz

In transportation
Mohawk Subdivision, a railroad line in New York
NYC Mohawk, the 4-8-2 steam locomotive wheel arrangement
Mohawk, one of the Sunbeam side-valve aircraft engines
the Mohawk (GTW train), a named passenger train of the Grand Trunk Western Railroad
the Mohawk (NYC train), a named passenger train of the New York Central Railroad

Roads and raceways
Mohawk Raceway, Campbellville, Ontario, Canada
Mohawk Road (Hamilton, Ontario)
Mohawk Trail, a Native American trade route, now part of Massachusetts Route 2

Other uses
Mohawk, the name of a 1956 Operation Redwing nuclear test
Mohawk Area School District, a school system in Pennsylvania
Mohawk College, a college in Hamilton, Ontario
Mohawk Chapel, the oldest church in Ontario
Mohawk Sports Park, Hamilton, Ontario
Mohawk turn in figure skating
Mohawk (1956 film), a 1956 western
 Mohawk (1986 novel), a 1986 novel by Richard Russo
 Mohawk (2017 film), a 2017 thriller set during The War of 1812
 Mohawk (crater), an impact crater in the Elysium quadrangle of Mars

See also

Mohocks, an early eighteenth-century London gang

Language and nationality disambiguation pages